National Highway 548A, commonly referred to as NH 548A is a national highway in  India. It is a spur road of National Highway 48. NH-548A traverses the state Maharashtra in India.

Route 

Shahapur, Murbad, Karjat, Khalapur, Pali, Roha, Tala, Mandad, Agardanda.

Junctions  

  Terminal near Shahapur.
  near Nagothana.

See also 

 List of National Highways in India
 List of National Highways in India by state

References

External links 

 NH 548A on OpenStreetMap

National highways in India
National Highways in Maharashtra